Beni Ourtilane (in Kabyle: At wertilan) is a town and commune in Setif Province, Kabylie in north-eastern Algeria.

The city is mainly Kabyle.

Notable people
 Fodil El Ouartilani, Algerian independence activist and advisor to Imam Yahya of Yemen
 Hocine El Ouartilani, Islamic scholar and travel writer

References

Communes of Sétif Province